Claudia Corsini (born December 24, 1977 in Rome) is a two-time Olympic modern pentathlete from Italy. She won a silver medal for the team at the 2002 World Modern Pentathlon Championships in San Francisco, California, and an individual gold at the 2005 World Modern Pentathlon Championships in Warsaw, Poland.

At the 2004 Summer Olympics, Corsini missed out the podium in the women's event, when she finished fourth in the overall results, with a score of 5,324 points. She aimed higher chances of winning an Olympic medal at her second games in Beijing, but her poor performance in the fencing segment landed her to fourteenth place. Shortly after the Olympics, Corsini eventually retired from her sporting career.

References

External links
  (archived page from Pentathlon.org)

1977 births
Living people
Italian female modern pentathletes
Olympic modern pentathletes of Italy
Modern pentathletes at the 2004 Summer Olympics
Modern pentathletes at the 2008 Summer Olympics
World Modern Pentathlon Championships medalists
Sportspeople from Rome